William Pettigrew may refer to:
 William Pettigrew (politician) (1825–1906), mayor of Brisbane, Queensland, Australia, and member of the Legislative Council of Queensland
 William Pettigrew (missionary) (1869–1943), British Christian missionary
 Willie Pettigrew (born 1953), Scottish footballer